Christopher Clayton Joyner (May 16, 1948 – September 10, 2011) was Professor of Government and Foreign Service at Georgetown University. With Anthony Clark Arend, he founded the Institute for International Law and Politics, which he directed.

Dr. Joyner taught previously at George Washington University, the University of Virginia, Dartmouth College and Muhlenberg College and had been a senior research fellow with the Woods Hole Oceanographic Institution and the Institute for Antarctic and Southern Ocean Studies at the University of Tasmania, Australia. At Georgetown, he taught courses on international law, international organization, and global environmental regimes.

Recognized as one of the leading experts on international law and Antarctica, he was the author of numerous books, including International Law in the 21st Century: Rules for Global Governance, Governing the Frozen Commons: The Antarctic Regime and Environmental Protection, and The United Nations and International Law.

Publications
Joyner, Christopher C. (1981) "U.N. General Assembly Resolutions and International Law: Rethinking the Contemporary Dynamics of Norm-Creation," California Western International Law Journal: Vol. 11: No. 3, Article 11. Available at: https://scholarlycommons.law.cwsl.edu/cwilj/vol11/iss3/11

References

External links 
 

1948 births
2011 deaths
American legal scholars
International relations scholars
Georgetown University faculty
George Washington University faculty
Academic staff of the University of Victoria
Dartmouth College faculty
Muhlenberg College faculty